Gulu University (GU) is a university in Uganda. It is one of the nine public universities in the country, as of September 2016.

Location
, GU has three campuses.

That campus became operational in 2011.

(c) Upon the request of the Kingdom of Bunyoro, the university established a campus in the city of Hoima, offering agriculture, the environment, computer science, information technology, business studies, accounting and education.

History
GU was established by Act 7 of 2001 of the Parliament of Uganda. That Act was subsequently amended by Act 3 of 2006. The university admitted its first students and commenced teaching activities in September 2002.

Progress
On 23 January 2010, during the fifth annual graduation ceremony, GU awarded degrees to 1,050 graduates, including 40 medical doctors, the first graduating class of the Gulu University School of Medicine (with the help of the University of Naples Federico II). The graduates also included thirteen students who received a Master of Business Administration degree.

Former association with Lira University

The campus, then named Lira University College, admitted its first students in August 2012 (100 of them). It continued operating in this capacity until the Ugandan Parliament (Act No. 35, July 2016) elevated it to an independent public university. Since 1 August 2016, it has been referred to as Lira University.

Academic courses

Undergraduate programs
, the following undergraduate academic degree courses were offered at GU, according to an advertisement placed in the New Vision by the university.

Faculty of Agriculture and the Environment
 Bachelor of Agriculture
 Bachelor of Science in Biosystems Engineering
 Bachelor of Science in Agri-Entrepreneurship and Communication Management
Bachelor of Science in Food and Agribusiness

Faculty of Business and Development Studies
 Bachelor of Business Administration
 Bachelor of Public Administration
 Bachelor of Development Studies
 Bachelor of Science in Economics
 Bachelor of Quantitative Economics

Faculty of Law
 Bachelor of Laws

Faculty of Education and Humanities
 Bachelor of Arts Education
 Bachelor of Business Education

Faculty of Medicine
 Bachelor of Medicine and Bachelor of Surgery

Faculty of Science
 Bachelor of Science Education in Biological Sciences
 Bachelor of Science Education  in Physical Sciences
 Bachelor of Science Education in Economics
 Bachelor of Science Education in Sport Science
 Bachelor of Science in Computer Science
 Bachelor of Information and Communication Technology

Postgraduate programs
The following postgraduate degree courses were offered at GU in January 2016.

Faculty of Medicine
 Master of Medicine in Surgery
 Master of Medical Anthropology

Faculty of Business and Development Studies
 Master of Business Administration
 Master of Arts in Public Administration & Management
 Master of Arts in Conflict Transformation Studies
 Master of Arts in Governance and Ethics

Faculty of Science
 Master of Science in Applied Tropical Entomology and Parasitology
 Master of Science in Agri-Enterprises Development
 Master of Science in Food Security and Community Nutrition

Students
In July 2014, GU admitted 2,500 privately sponsored students and approximately 250 government-sponsored students. The total student population in 2014 was about 5,000, including diploma, undergraduate, and postgraduate programme enrollees.

Staff
, GU employed 421 full-time staff, of whom 241 were academic staff and 180 were non-teaching staff. As of August 2013, the university had a shortage of 73 academic staff, according to Vice Chancellor Jack Nyeko Pen-Mogi.

See also
 List of university leaders in Uganda
 List of universities in Uganda
 List of law schools in Uganda
 List of business schools in Uganda
 List of medical schools in Uganda
 Education in Uganda

References

External links
   Gulu University Website
 The Neapolitan Project To Develop The Faculty of Medicine at Gulu University
 Latest News from Gulu University
 ‘Residents blocking varsity expansion’
 Gulu University to Build Multi-billion Teaching Hospital, Bio-science Lab

Gulu
Acholi sub-region
Northern Region, Uganda
Education in Uganda
Gulu University
Educational institutions established in 2001
2001 establishments in Uganda